= Chauhdry Abdul Aziz =

Pakistani Justice of the Lahore High Court

Chaudhry Abdul Aziz

Justice of the Lahore High Court
- Incumbent
- Assumed office 26 November 2016

Personal details
- Born: 9 September 1971 (age 55)

Chaudhry Abdul Aziz (born 9 September 1971) is a Pakistani jurist who has been a judge of the Lahore High Court since 26 November 2016.

== Judicial career ==
Aziz was inducted into the Lahore High Court (LHC) as an additional judge on 26 November 2016. He became a permanent judge of the LHC on 22 October 2018.
